Red Horse was a sub-chief of the Miniconjou Sioux. He fought in the 1876 Battle of the Little Bighorn, and in 1881 he gave one of the few detailed accountings of the event. He also drew pictographs of the Little Bighorn Battle.
Red Horse married twice and had three children.

Ledger drawings
Red Horse drew 42 ledger book drawings illustrating the Battle of Little Big Horn. The drawings are held in the Smithsonian Institution's National Anthropological Archives, and a selection has been exhibited at the Cantor Art Center at Stanford University in the exhibition, Red Horse: Drawings of the Battle of the Little Bighorn. The drawings were commissioned by Charles E. McChesney, an Army doctor. The drawings were made in 1881. They were drawn with colored pencil on the manilla paper.

The drawings show hand-to-hand warfare in a brutally honest manner, and have been described as "the most trustworthy sort of visual depiction we have of the battle" that does not centralize General George Custer's role in the fighting.

References

Works

"The Battle of Little Bighorn: An Eyewitness Account by the Lakota Chief Red Horse Recorded in Pictographs and Text at the Cheyenne River Reservation, 1881," Archives of the West, www.pbs.org/

External links 

 Rodney G. Thomas, "Indian Casualties According to Red Horse," on Diane Merkel (ed.), Little Bighorn website, www.littlebighorn.info/
 "Red Horse - Miniconjou Chief," First People, www.firstpeople.us/ —Photograph of Red Horse.

1822 births
1907 deaths
People of the Great Sioux War of 1876
Native American people of the Indian Wars
Lakota leaders
People of the American Old West
Miniconjou people